Raya-varam is a village in the district of Medak in the state of Telangana, India.

References

Villages in Medak district